Point Hill is a settlement in Jamaica. It has a population of 5,766 as of 2009.

References

Populated places in Saint Catherine Parish

 other from that there is no more information
you'll be updated when there's newss